Ace Troubleshooter, often shortened to Ace, was an American pop punk band. Formed in December 1995 in Minneapolis, Minnesota, they released five albums through Tooth & Nail Records.

Background 

Formed in Minneapolis, Minnesota, the band gained attention in 1996 by winning a national battle of the bands competition, sponsored by Sam Goody. Warne came up with the band's name after reading the phrase, ace troubleshooter, in a history book.

The Ace Troubleshooter lineup changed several times, they started as a three-piece: John Warne, Josh Abbott and Matt Pacyga. They added Isaac Deaton as the second guitarist in 1998. Numerous bassists and guitarists rotated through. Only two original members, John Warne and Josh Abbott, remained when the band came to an end. They had both played in the short-lived band Guerilla Rodeo shortly before Ace disbanded.

Relient K was often known as the "brother band" to Ace Troubleshooter. The two bands performed multiple tours together, and the members were all friends with each other. Dave Douglas, a touring drummer for Relient K, filled-in as a guitarist for a short time. Warne filled in as bassist for Relient K when Brian Pittman first left. Relient K's Matt Thiessen said in 2000 that they were allowed by Ace to live on their bus, as Relient K was just starting out.

In February 2005 Toby David posted the announcement of the band's breakup on their message board. Warne left to play bass guitar for Relient K. Abbott went on to play for My Red Hot Nightmare.

Members 

Final line-up
 John Warne – lead vocals, guitar (1995–2005)
 Josh Abbott – drums (1997–2005)
 Toby David – guitar (2003–2005)
 Joe Krube – bass guitar, backing vocals (2003–2005)

Former members
 Matt Pacyga – bass guitar (1997–1999)
 Cody Oaks – bass guitar (1999–2001)
 Isaac Deaton – guitar, backing vocals (1998–2003)
 Dave Douglas – guitar, backing vocals (2001)
 Jimmy Taylor – guitar (2001)
 Ben Dewey – bass (2001–2003)

Discography 

 Back in the Shootin' Match (1996)
 Don't Stop a Rockin''' (1999)
 Ace Troubleshooter (2000)
 The Madness of the Crowds (2002)
 It's Never Enough'' (2004)

References 

American pop punk groups
Christian rock groups from Minnesota
Tooth & Nail Records artists
Musical groups established in 1995
Musical groups disestablished in 2005